Sir Thomas Parry FBA  (4 August 1904 – 22 April 1985) was a Welsh writer and academic. He was Professor of Welsh at the University College of North Wales, Bangor from 1947 to 1953, Librarian of the National Library of Wales from 1953 to 1958, Principal of the University College of Wales Aberystwyth from 1958 to 1969 and Vice-Chancellor of the University of Wales from 1961 to 1963 and 1967 to 1969.

He was knighted in the 1978 Birthday Honours.

The Thomas Parry Library located on Aberystwyth University's Llanbadarn Campus was named in his honour in 1995.

References

1904 births
1985 deaths
Academics of Aberystwyth University
Fellows of the British Academy
Knights Bachelor
Welsh librarians
20th-century Welsh writers
Vice-Chancellors of Aberystwyth University
Vice-Chancellors of the University of Wales